Kath & Kim, commonly written as Kath and Kim and uncommonly abbreviated as K&K is an American television sitcom adapted from the Australian television series of the same name created by Jane Turner and Gina Riley and well-supported by Magda Szubanski, with their titular roles being portrayed in this series by Molly Shannon and Selma Blair. The series premiered on NBC on October 9, 2008. Turner and Riley served as executive producers and consultants on this version, which was co-produced through Reveille Productions and Universal Media Studios.

The first episode premiered in Australia on October 12, 2008, on the Seven Network. The show's Australian broadcast was cancelled after the second episode the following week. The series was then pushed to a "graveyard" slot of 11 pm on Mondays and then pre-empted for the 2009 Australian Open after the first-run airing of episode 9, "Friends". Although the show initially gained modest ratings and mixed reviews from critics, NBC picked up Kath & Kim for a full season order of 22 episodes on October 31, 2008. On January 15, 2009, NBC cut the episode order from 22 to 17 episodes. The series finale aired on March 12, 2009.

On May 19, 2009, NBC cancelled the series after one season.

Cast and characters
 Molly Shannon as Kathleen "Kath" Day
 Selma Blair as Kimberly Crystal "Kim" Day Baker
 John Michael Higgins as Phillip "Phil" Lesley Knight
 Mikey Day as Craig Baker
 Justina Machado as Angel
 Melissa Rauch as Tina

Production
Prior to being adapted to an American version, the first two seasons of the original version aired in the United States on Trio in 2004. After Trio folded it moved over to the Sundance Channel in early 2006.

On November 9, 2006, NBC announced a U.S. version of Kath & Kim. A pilot episode was produced by Reveille (the same studio that adapted Ugly Betty and The Office into U.S. hits) and NBC Universal, with Riley and Turner serving as executive producers and consultants. Paul Feig was picked to direct the pilot episode.

Originally, NBC wanted the series to air in the 2007–2008 fall television season, but decided against it. The series was greenlighted after the network named Reveille founder Ben Silverman its new entertainment head. Silverman had been trying to bring this adaptation to American screens since 2004. The show was ordered to series in early 2008. The series aired in Australia on Channel 7 in mid-2008, but only aired the pilot and first episode until it was taken off and replaced by repeats of the original series due to popular demand. The full series was later aired in Australia.

Casting
Molly Shannon was cast as Kath, and Selma Blair as Kim. Even though they are playing mother and daughter, Shannon is actually only eight years older than Blair: Shannon was born in 1964, Blair in 1972. Similarly, in the Australian version, Jane Turner (Kath) is only five months older than Gina Riley (Kim).

Several names have been changed for the US version. While Kath has retained her full name from the Australian series (in which she was known as Kath Day until her marriage to Kel at the end of Season 1) and Kim has retained her first name, Kim is known as Kim Day (rather than Kim Craig née Day) although in one episode Kath calls her by her full name in which Kim's original middle name of Diane was replaced with Crystal. The two other characters have different first names: Craig Baker (replacing Brett Craig) and Phil Knight (replacing Kel Knight), while the character of Sharon is entirely absent from the series, as Magda Szubanski objected to the casting.

Maya Rudolph made the show's first guest appearance as Athena Scooberman in episode 8, "Sacrifice". Pamela Anderson made the show's second guest appearance in episode 9, "Friends".

Location settings
Originally, the series setting was supposed to be set in Fountain Valley, a fictitious suburb of Phoenix, Arizona. There were suggestions of using the San Fernando Valley portion of Los Angeles, California, as the setting, after they started shooting episodes on June 13, 2008, in Los Angeles' West Hills neighborhood.  Throughout the series there were references to geographical setting as Central Florida; characters sometimes referenced short, sunny, afternoon rain downpours as are typical of Central Florida's climate.

Episodes

Reception

Critical response
The show received negative criticism from viewers and television critics, especially in the casting, adjusting of the tone of the show and even the show's costume design, which has led to Blair firing back over the claims that it ruins the creativity of the original. Early reviews of the pilot were poor, with the San Francisco Chronicle calling it "a contender for worst remake ever".

Ratings
Despite negative reviews, the series debut's ratings were strong. The show finished third overall with a total of 7.5 million viewers. In the 18- to 49- and 18- to 34-year-old demographics it placed second and first respectively. By its third episode, viewers had dropped to 4.99 million viewers, two thirds of the viewers from the pilot.

References

External links
 

2008 American television series debuts
2009 American television series endings
2000s American single-camera sitcoms
American television series based on Australian television series
English-language television shows
NBC original programming
Television series by Reveille Productions
Television series by Universal Television
Television shows set in Phoenix, Arizona